Wes Skiles Peacock Springs State Park is a   Florida State Park located on Peacock Springs Road, two miles (3 km) east of Luraville and on State Road 51,  southwest of Live Oak, Florida. Activities include picnicking, swimming and diving, and wildlife viewing. Among the wildlife of the park are deer, bobcats, raccoon, squirrels, beaver and otters, as well as turkey, blue heron and barred owls. The park name commemorates the work of diver and explorer Wes Skiles. Prior to 2010 the park was known as Peacock Springs State Park. Amenities include a nature trail, six sinkholes, and Peacock and Bonnet Springs, with miles of underwater caves popular with cave divers. The two springs are tributaries of the Suwannee River. The park is open from 8:00 am till sundown year round.

Expansion
This donation more than doubled the size of the park that was previously .

Cave System

The Peacock cave system is a karst environment in limestone.

The Peacock Springs Cave system was first explored by Vasco Murray in 1956. The first map of the system was completed by the National Speleological Society team leader, Sheck Exley, in 1995. Exley's team made over 521 dives to complete the survey. A resurvey of the system was completed in 1996 by a team led by Michael Poucher. As of June 13, 2008, the Peacock cave system was the 24th longest underwater cave in the world at 7408 meters. In 2010, a connection was made by Agnes Milowka and James Toland between Baptizing and Peacock springs, extending the total length of the system an additional .

On April 25, 2002, in order to protect the cave system from damage, the park stopped allowing divers to use Diver Propulsion Vehicles (DPV).

The cave system consists of seven major springs and sinkholes, six of which are located within Peacock Springs State Park. Peacock Springs is a popular destination for cave divers all over the world and is extensively used to train new cave divers.

Springs and Sinkholes

Peacock I
The Peacock I Spring is the most accessible and most popular site in the system with an elevated walkway and stairs leading to the spring.  There are three passageways that converge on the spring called the Pothole tunnel, the Peanut tunnel and the Peacock II tunnel.  Each of these three tunnels has a permanent guideline (called a gold line) placed in it to ease navigation by cave divers.

Pothole Tunnel
It contains large open passageways, relatively high ceilings and a silt bottom. The walls are often covered in silt but occasionally the silt will be blown away by floods exposing the white limestone underneath.

Peanut Tunnel
The Peanut tunnel is a relatively shallow and narrow tunnel. It is named for a section that resembles the two lobes of a peanut. At approximately  into the tunnel, crossover tunnels connect the Peanut tunnel to the Pothole tunnel.

Peacock II Tunnel
The Peacock II tunnel leads to Peacock II spring.

Peacock II
Peacock II Spring is a smaller spring than Peacock I. It is one of only two sites available for diving by open water divers, as it contains no access to the cave system.

Pothole
Pothole is a small inline sink approximately one third of the distance between Peacock I and Olsen.  The sinkhole has a very small entrance into the Peacock Springs cave system and due to the steep sides, it is inaccessible to cave divers.

Olsen Sink
There are two small entrances into the cave system at Olsen dropping into the same tunnel. Being central to the cave system, Olsen was once a popular entrance for cave divers as it allowed easy access to much of the cave. To prevent erosion, cave divers are no longer permitted to enter at Olsen sink as of 2002, although it remains a popular place to temporarily surface during a dive.

Orange Grove
Orange Grove is a large terminal sinkhole northeast of Peacock I.  With a raised walkway and stairs leading into the sinkhole, it is a popular entrance into the cave. Two winding tunnels extend from the sinkhole called Lower Orange Grove and Upper Orange Grove. As a very advanced dive, it is not as popular as Upper Orange Grove. The tunnel extends outside Peacock Spring State Park to Challenge Sink.

Challenge Sink
Challenge is an inline sink, the northernmost sinkhole in the system, and is the only sinkhole outside of the Peacock Springs State Park.  Steep sides make entering and exiting Challenge difficult.  It is a popular destination for divers entering Upper Orange Grove.

Cisteen Sink
Cisteen is a large offset sink like Orange Grove. It offers a very small, silty entrance to the cave system, and is usually covered in a thick layer of duckweed.

Peacock III
Peacock III is a siphon, meaning it takes in water rather than discharging it, as a spring would. Peacock III has a separate system from Peacock I, II, and its related  sinks.

Waterhole
Waterhole is another offset sink. It contains geological features not seen in the rest of the system, such as low bedding planes, as opposed to the vaulted ceilings found in the rest of the system.

Gallery

References

External links

 Wes Skiles Peacock Springs State Park at Florida State Parks
 Peacock Springs State Recreation Area at Absolutely Florida
 Maps of the cave system

Parks in Suwannee County, Florida
State parks of Florida
Caves of Florida
Landforms of Suwannee County, Florida
Bodies of water of Suwannee County, Florida
Springs of Florida